The Nordic Under-17 Football Championship (also Nordic Under-17 Tournament or Nordic Cup) is an open Nordic championship tournament for under-17 national football teams.

The competition has been held annually since 1975, exceptions being years 1981 and 1983. It has been an "under-17" event since 2005. The tournament takes place each year in a different Nordic country. It has also been held once in West Germany (1980) and once in England (1999). The competition currently rotates annually between the six main Nordic nations; Denmark, Faroe Islands, Finland, Iceland, Norway and Sweden.

Age limits 
Under-15: 1984–1990
Under-16: 1975–1982, 1991–2000, 2003–2004
Under-17: 2001–2002, 2005–

Winners

Tournaments

References 

Nordic Cup for Juniors RSSSF
Swedish Football Association Official Homepage (in Swedish)

 
Under-17 association football
International association football competitions in Europe
Inter-Nordic sports competitions